Colin Einar Boyce (born 30 October 1962) is an Australian politician who is a member of the House of Representatives, representing the Division of Flynn since 2022. He is a member of the Liberal National Party and sits with the National Party in federal parliament.

Boyce was also previously the Liberal National Party member for Callide in the Queensland Legislative Assembly from 2017 to 2022.

Early career
Prior to becoming the state member for Callide, Boyce served as a councillor on Taroom Shire Council from 2005 until 2008.  In 2008, he unsuccessfully attempted to be elected as the Division 6 candidate on Banana Shire Council. However, at a 2017 by-election, his wife Terri Boyce was elected to represent the same division.

Boyce is a qualified boilermaker and farmer who has been described as "an old-style Queensland National".

State politics
Boyce was elected as the member for Callide in the 2017 state election.

In August 2020, he attracted some media attention when he crossed the floor and voted against his own party, not offering his support for a bill to appoint a special commissioner to oversee mine rehabilitation.

Federal politics
In January 2021 Boyce announced he would seek LNP preselection for the federal Division of Flynn to contest the 2022 federal election, following the retirement of Ken O'Dowd. Boyce subsequently won pre-selection and was officially announced as the LNP's candidate for Flynn on 13 July 2021 while visiting the Gladstone Power Station with Deputy Prime Minister Barnaby Joyce, Senator Matt Canavan and outgoing Flynn MP Ken O'Dowd.

Boyce officially resigned from his position as the state member for Callide in Queensland Parliament on 29 March 2022. Although Boyce wasn't required to resign until the federal election was officially called, he decided to do so to focus on his bid to win the Federal seat of Flynn, beginning by promoting the Australian federal budget which was handed down the night of his resignation from state parliament.  Boyce's decision to resign early drew criticism from Robbie Katter who said Boyce had missed the chance to side with the Katter's Australian Party to support their bill to wind back Great Barrier Reef regulations.  His resignation triggered the 2022 Callide state by-election, which Queensland speaker Curtis Pitt announced would be held on 18 June 2022.

During his campaign to be elected as the member for Flynn, Boyce attracted media attention after making comments which appeared to question the Morrison government's plan to reach net zero carbon emissions by 2050 by describing it as "flexible" with "wiggle room".

Boyce was successful in his election to federal parliament in the election in May 2022, achieving a narrow victory over Labor candidate Matt Burnett.

Following his election to federal parliament, Boyce was criticised by Queensland resources minister Scott Stewart who said during parliamentary question time on 24 May 2022 that Boyce had made it clear that he was "an LNP climate change denier." This was followed by an article in The Guardian two days later which revealed Boyce was a foundation member of The Saltbush Club, and in 2019 had been a signatory to an international statement which claimed there was no climate emergency.

References

External links
Parliamentary Profile

1962 births
Living people
Members of the Queensland Legislative Assembly
Liberal National Party of Queensland politicians
21st-century Australian politicians
Members of the Australian House of Representatives
Members of the Australian House of Representatives for Flynn
Liberal National Party of Queensland members of the Parliament of Australia
National Party of Australia members of the Parliament of Australia